Anthony Andrew DePhillips (September 20, 1912 – May 5, 1994) was a Major League Baseball catcher with the Cincinnati Reds. He played in 35 games, all during the 1943 season.

Biography
DePhillips was born in New York, New York and attended Fordham University. For his career, he compiled a .100 batting average in 20 at-bats, with two runs batted in.

In the late 1950s and early 1960s, DePhillips served as the physical education teacher at the Henley School in Jamaica Estates, New York.

Tony was a standout basketball and baseball player at Newtown High School and at Fordham University. He played minor league baseball for the New York Yankees and played in the Major Leagues with the Cincinnati Reds. Tony also officiated college and NBA basketball games and was a scout for the Philadelphia A's and the New York Yankees.

On November 11, 1949 Tony opened a sporting goods store on Francis Lewis Blvd in Bayside. The grand opening was attended by sports greats of the times which included Phil Rizzuto of the Yankees, Gene Hermanski of the Dodgers, and Jake LaMotta the middleweight boxing champ. In the spring of 1950 Tony started a youth baseball league in the neighborhood with 150 kids. By 1954 600 youngsters were participating and by 1958 Tony's youth club had 1200 members.

Initially a baseball club, other sports were added that included basketball, football, bowling, handball, roller hockey and archery. The initial ages of the participants were 10-14 with 15-16 year old division being added in 1952 and a 9-year-old group in 1953.Varsity baseball and basketball travel teams were also added, and players from those teams went on to participate in high school and college teams and receive major league tryouts.

In 1978, he was inducted into the Fordham University Hall of Fame. He died on May 5, 1994 in Port Jefferson, New York at the age of 81.He also founded a sporting goods store—De Phillips Sports—in Flushing NY, which is still in business and can be found at 33-05 Francis Lewis Blvd, Bayside Queens.

References

External links

 Baseball Almanac

1912 births
1994 deaths
Cincinnati Reds players
Major League Baseball catchers
Baseball players from New York (state)
Minor league baseball managers
Dayton Ducks players
Akron Yankees players
Binghamton Triplets players
Augusta Tigers players
Newark Bears (IL) players
Little Rock Travelers players
Kansas City Blues (baseball) players
Birmingham Barons players
Bridgeport Bees players
Fordham Rams baseball players
Burials in Queens, New York, by place